Trioceros feae, also known commonly as the Bioko montane chameleon and Fea's chameleon, is a species of lizard in the family Chamaeleonidae. The species is endemic to the island of Bioko.

Etymology
The specific name, feae, is in honor of Leonardo Fea, who was an Italian explorer and naturalist.

Habitat

Reproduction
T. feae is oviparous.

References

Further reading
Boulenger GA (1906). "Report on the Reptiles collected by the late L. Fea in West Africa". Annali del Museo Civico di Storia Naturale di Genova, Serie Terza [=Third Series] 2: 196–216. (Chamæleon feae, new species, pp. 207–208 + Figure 4, two views).
Campbell PD, Denzer W (2020). "Annotated catalogue of chameleon types in the collection of the Natural History Museum, UK (NHMUK) (Reptilia: Squamata: Chamaeleonidae)". Zootaxa 4742 (3): 481–500.
Nečas P (1999). Chameleons: Nature's hidden Jewels. Frankfurt am Main, Germany: Edition Chimaira. 348 pp.  (Europe),  (USA, Canada).
Tilbury CR, Tolley KA (2009). "A re-appraisal of the systematics of the African genus Chamaeleo (Reptilia: Chamaeleonidae)". Zootaxa 2079: 57–68. (Trioceros feae, new combination).

Trioceros
Reptiles described in 1906
Taxa named by George Albert Boulenger
Reptiles of Equatorial Guinea